Tomas Petar Rogic (born 16 December 1992) is an Australian professional footballer who plays as an attacking midfielder for West Bromwich Albion and the Australia national team.

Born in Canberra, Rogic played youth football with Tuggeranong United before playing senior football for ANU FC and Belconnen United. In 2011, Rogic joined Nike Football Academy after winning a global competition. He returned to Australia in 2012 to play for Central Coast Mariners, before moving to Scottish club Celtic in 2013. After a loan spell at Melbourne Victory, Rogic established himself in the Celtic first team and made 273 appearances over nine years at the club.

Rogic has 53 caps for Australia, scoring ten goals. He has also represented Australia in futsal.

Early life

Rogic is of Serbian descent and attended Radford College in Bruce, ACT.

Club career

Early career
As a junior, Rogic played for Woden Weston and Tuggeranong United. In 2009, he moved to his first senior club, playing with ANU FC in the ACT Premier League. In 2011, Rogic moved to Belconnen United where he played for a season in the same league. The same year, he was also selected to join the Nike Football Academy after winning The Chance.  A total of 75,000 young footballers selected around the world participated in the competition, but it was Rogic alongside seven other young footballers won the competition.

Central Coast Mariners
On January 2, 2012, Rogic signed with the A-League club Central Coast Mariners. He made his professional debut in the 2011–12 A-League season, on 21 January 2012 in a Round 18 clash against Adelaide United, which the Mariners won 3–2. He scored his first goal for the club in a 2–1 loss to Melbourne Victory on 10 February 2012, and was later named the A-League's young player of the month for February 2012.

At the beginning of the 2012–13 season, Rogic rejected advances from other A-League clubs, opting to remain with the Mariners. Rogic scored his first goals of the season in the home victory against Sydney FC, scoring two goals to help the Mariners win 7–2 against the Sky Blues. On 5 December 2012, Rogic was awarded the NAB Young Footballer of the Month Award for November 2012, as well as simultaneously being the second nomination for the NAB Young Footballer of the Year Award. In only his first full A-League season, Rogic received interest from Premier League sides Reading and Fulham, La Liga sides Celta Vigo and Rayo Vallecano, and Pro League club, Club Brugge.

Celtic

On 9 January 2013, it was reported that Rogic had joined Scottish Premier League champions Celtic at their training camp in Spain. On 16 January 2013, it was reported that terms had been agreed for the transfer of Rogic from Central Coast Mariners to Celtic, subject to personal terms. The deal was completed the next day. Rogic made his Celtic debut on 9 February 2013 in an SPL match against Inverness Caledonian Thistle; setting up Kris Commons with a cross to score the equaliser, bringing the score to 1–1. Celtic went on to win 3–1 and Rogic won the Man of the Match award. He made a further seven appearances for Celtic that season.

2013–15: Injuries and Loan to Melbourne Victory
The following season saw Rogic make only a handful of appearances for Celtic, and he was sent out on loan to Melbourne Victory in January 2014.A recurring groin injury limited Rogic's appearances for Melbourne, and the injury eventually caused him to miss the 2014 FIFA World Cup and 2015 AFC Asian Cup for Australia. He was required to have two operations on his groin and did not play again until March 2015 when he made his comeback in Celtic's Development side match against Motherwell.

2015–22: Celtic First Team Regular
On August 9, 2015, Rogic made his first start for Celtic in almost two years, scoring the opening goal in a 2–0 win against Partick Thistle. He began to regularly feature in the team and scored further goals against St Johnstone and Dundee in the weeks that followed. His goal against Kilmarnock on 19 March 2016 earned Rogic the club's goal of the season award for 2015–16.

Despite reported interest from the likes of Arsenal, Fiorentina, and Valencia, Rogic signed a new three-year contract with Celtic on 9 August 2016. The following day, he scored twice as Celtic beat Motherwell 5–0 in the Scottish League Cup. He followed this up by scoring the opener in the first leg of the Champions League play-off tie against Hapoel Be'er Sheva on 17 August 2016; Celtic went on to win 5–2.

Rogic scored the first goal in Celtic's 3–0 triumph over Aberdeen in the Scottish League Cup Final at Hampden Park on 27 November 2016. He scored another winning goal in injury time against Motherwell on 3 December, firing home from just outside the box to give Celtic a 4–3 win at Fir Park. On 27 May 2017, Rogic scored a late winner against Aberdeen in the Scottish Cup Final, securing the domestic treble for Celtic.

In May 2018, Rogic signed a new contract with Celtic.

After a prolonged period out of the Celtic starting 11, in August 2020 it looked as if Rogic's time at Celtic would be over. He was linked with an unnamed Qatari club for a fee of around £4 million before the move fell through. After a lacklustre trophyless season, the signing of Australian manager Ange Postecoglou in June 2021 acted as a renaissance moment for Rogic's career. Knowing his new boss from the Australian national team, Rogic was entrusted with time in the starting eleven. Through impressive performances characteristic of his earlier years at Celtic, he earned a spot in the PFA Scotland Team of the Year.

On 13 May 2022, Celtic announced that Rogic and Nir Bitton would both be leaving the club after the final game of the season against Motherwell. Rogic said: "It has been a phenomenal journey, with some magical moments – it has been an honour to be a part of this experience. While I am so sad to leave, I feel so proud to be part of a team that has delivered the title again for our fans. The club is in a great position and I know the manager will take the club on and deliver more and more success." He started the match before being substituted for James McCarthy at the hour mark, for which he received a standing ovation from the Celtic Park crowd. He and Bitton brought out the Scottish Premiership trophy together, which club captain Callum McGregor then lifted aloft with his departing teammates standing on either side.

West Bromwich Albion

On 12 September 2022, Rogic joined EFL Championship club West Bromwich Albion on a free transfer, signing a deal until the end of the season. on 1 October 2022, Rogic made his debut for Albion in a 3-2 home defeat to Swansea City, lasting 57 minutes before being substituted. He scored his first goal for the club on 12 December 2022, equalizing in a 2–1 away win against Sunderland.

International career

Futsal
Rogic has represented Australia at Futsal. At the 2010 AFC Futsal Championship Rogic scored six goals, making him Australia's leading goal scorer and tied for the fourth leading goal scorer for the tournament at the age of 18.

Olympic
On 7 March 2012, Rogic was selected to represent the Australia Olympic team in an Asian Olympic Qualifier match against Iraq, during which he made his debut as a halftime substitute for his Central Coast Mariners teammate Mustafa Amini at the Central Coast Stadium in Gosford.

Senior
Rogic made his debut for the Australia national team on 14 November 2012 as a substitute in a 2–1 friendly victory over South Korea. On 11 June 2013, Rogic came on as a substitute in Australia's 4–0 win against Jordan in a 2014 World Cup Qualifier and provided the assist for captain Lucas Neill's first international goal.

On 3 September 2015, Rogic scored his first and second goal for Australia, scoring in a 5–0 defeat of Bangladesh in a 2018 FIFA World Cup qualifier. In March 2016, Rogic scored two goals in three minutes against Tajikistan after coming off the bench in a World Cup Qualifier that ended 7–0 in Australia's favor. In the following qualifier against Jordan five days later, Rogic scored another goal for Australia in a 5–0 win.

On 8 June 2017, Rogic scored the decisive goal in a 3–2 win over Saudi Arabia in a World Cup qualifier. Rogic perfectly controlled the ball before booting it past the goalkeeper into the net from outside the box. Rogic also joined Australia as they competed in the 2017 FIFA Confederations Cup. In Australia's first group match against Germany, he played a key role, as he scored a goal in the first half as well as setting up Tomi Juric in the second. Despite his heroics Australia lost 3–2. Rogic was an unused substitute in Australia's final group match that saw them draw 1–1 with Chile.

In May 2018, he was named in Australia's 23-man squad for the 2018 FIFA World Cup in Russia.

At the end of August 2021, Rogic was called on again for the third round of the 2022 FIFA World Cup qualifiers and subsequently registered his first appearance for the Socceroos since November 2019, as he started the match against China PR (where he also assisted Martin Boyle for the second goal of the game and took part in a 3–0 win) on 2 September 2021.

Career statistics

Club

International

Scores and results list Australia's goal tally first, score column indicates score after each Rogic goal.

Honours
Central Coast Mariners
 A-League Premiership: 2011–12

Celtic
Scottish Premiership: 2015–16, 2016–17, 2017–18, 2018–19, 2019–20, 2021–22
Scottish Cup: 2012–13, 2016–17, 2017–18, 2018–19, 2019–20
Scottish League Cup: 2016–17, 2017–18, 2018–19, 2019–20, 2021–22

Individual
AFC Asian Cup Dream Team: 2019
PFA Scotland Team of the Year (Premiership): 2021–22
PFA Men's Footballer of the Year: 2021–22

References

External links

 
 
 
 
 

1992 births
Living people
Australian soccer players
Australia international soccer players
Australian men's futsal players
Central Coast Mariners FC players
Melbourne Victory FC players
Celtic F.C. players
West Bromwich Albion F.C. players
A-League Men players
Australian people of Serbian descent
Association football midfielders
Sportspeople from Canberra
Soccer players from the Australian Capital Territory
Australian expatriate soccer players
Expatriate footballers in Scotland
Australian expatriate sportspeople in Scotland
Australian expatriate sportspeople in England
Scottish Premier League players
Scottish Professional Football League players
2017 FIFA Confederations Cup players
2018 FIFA World Cup players
Nike Academy players
2019 AFC Asian Cup players